Aslıhan Kılıç (born 21 April 1998) is a Turkish volleyball player for Aydın Büyükşehir Belediyespor and the Turkish national team.

She participated at the  2018 FIVB Volleyball Women's Nations League. She plays for Aydın Büyükşehir Belediyespor.

References

External links 
 https://www.cev.eu/News.aspx?NewsID=25487&ID=5
 https://www.cev.eu/Competition-Area/PlayerDetails.aspx?TeamID=9880&PlayerID=60745&ID=839

1998 births
Living people
Eczacıbaşı volleyball players
Turkish women's volleyball players
Aydın Büyükşehir Belediyespor volleyballers
Competitors at the 2018 Mediterranean Games
Mediterranean Games bronze medalists for Turkey
Mediterranean Games medalists in volleyball
21st-century Turkish women